Humblot's heron (Ardea humbloti), also known as the Madagascar heron, is a species of heron. In Madagascar, it is common on the north and west coasts of the island, but is also found inland, especially near Lake Alaotra. It is also present in the Comoro Islands and Mayotte. 
Humblot's heron is an endangered species, with a population estimated at only 1,500 mature individuals. Its population is apparently declining. The major threats the heron faces are poaching (both the bird itself and its eggs) and habitat destruction (the cutting of nesting trees and the disappearance of wetlands.)

The scientific name commemorates the French naturalist Leon Humblot.

References

External links
BirdLife Species Factsheet.

Humblot's heron
Humblot's heron
Birds of the Comoros
Birds of Madagascar
Humblot's heron